Paul B. Thompson is a philosopher currently teaching at Michigan State University, where he holds the W.K. Kellogg Chair in Agricultural Food and Community Ethics. Thompson was born in 1951 in Springfield, Missouri. He earned his B.A. at Emory University before going on to earn a Ph.D. in philosophy at the State University of New York at Stony Brook. He formerly taught at Texas A&M University and Purdue University before joining MSU, where he now teaches and does research on ethical and philosophical questions dealing with agriculture and food and especially the development of agricultural techno-science.

He is a member of the Editorial Advisory Board for Public Philosophy Journal.

Contributions to philosophy
Thompson has served on national and international committees on agricultural biotechnology such as the International Advisory Panel for the PEGASUS Project on Animal Biotechnology, the Advisory Committee on Biotechnology for the Board of Agriculture and Natural Resources (part of the National Research Council based in Washington D.C.), The Scientific Advisory Committee for the Mansholt Graduate School at Wageningen University and Research Institute, and was the Chair of the Council on Agricultural Science and Technology's Working Group on Ethics and Animal Agricultural Biotechnology from 2006 to 2010. Thompson also contributed to the National Research Council report entitled The Environmental Effects of Transgenic Plants. He is a past President of the Society for Philosophy and Technology and the Agriculture, Food and Human Values Society.

Selected works
P. B. Thompson, The Agrarian Vision: Sustainability and Environmental Ethics. Lexington, KY: The University Press of Kentucky, 2010.
P. B. Thompson, Ed. The Ethics of Intensification: Agricultural Development and Cultural Change. Dordrecht, NL: Springer, 2008.
K. David and P. B. Thompson, Eds. What Can Nanotechnology Learn from Biotechnology? Social and Ethical Lessons for Nanoscience from the Debate over Agrifood Biotechnology and GMOs. Burlington, MA: Academic Press, 2008.
J. B. Callicott and R. Frodeman, Eds-in-Chief; V. Davion, B. Norton, C. Palmer and P. B. Thompson, Assoc. Eds. Encyclopedia of Environmental Ethics and Philosophy Farmington Hills, MI: 2008, Gale-Cengage Learning.
P. B. Thompson and T. C. Hilde, Eds. The Agrarian Roots of Pragmatism. Nashville, TN: Vanderbilt University Press, 2000.
P. B. Thompson, Agricultural Ethics: Research, Teaching and Public Policy, Ames, IA: Iowa State University Press, 1998.
P.B. Thompson, Food Biotechnology in Ethical Perspective, London: Chapman and Hall (Blackie Academic and Professional), 1997.
P.B. Thompson, The Spirit of the Soil: Agriculture and Environmental Ethics, New York and London: Routledge Publishing Co., 1995.
P.B. Thompson, R. Matthews, E.O. van Ravenswaay, Ethics, Public Policy, and Agriculture, New York: Macmillan, 1994.
P.B. Thompson, The Ethics of Aid and Trade: U.S. Food Policy, Foreign Competition and the Social Contract, New York: Cambridge University Press, 1992.
W. Browne, J. Skees, L. Swanson, P.B. Thompson, and L. Unnevehr, Sacred Cows and Hot Potatoes: Agrarian Myths and Policy Realities, Boulder, CO: Westview Press, 1992.
P.B. Thompson and B. A. Stout, Eds. Beyond the Large Farm: Ethics and Research Goals for Agriculture, Boulder, CO: Westview Press, 1991.

See also
American philosophy
List of American philosophers
Environmental ethics

References 

Living people
Michigan State University alumni
Michigan State University faculty
American ethicists
Year of birth missing (living people)